Schnorrer Club of Morrisania was established in 1881.  It was located at East 163rd Street, 1 block east of Third Avenue. Membership included many notable figures and it was active in Democratic Party politics. It closed in 1966.

A recreational social club, the Schnorrers were part of "voluntary association" based on the German Vereine or society.

A passage in To Darling Ellie and Dana describes the club as being a big German-American club that people went to for fun. It was said to reek of beer. The club was also testified about in the Senate of the State of New York in a report of the Joint Legislative Committee in testimony regarding P. Erskine Wood.

Members
 Peter J. Everett, New York Assemblyman circa 1903

See also
 Schnorrer
 Morrisania, Bronx

References

Organizations established in 1881
Clubs and societies in New York City
1881 establishments in New York (state)
Organizations based in the Bronx
Morrisania, Bronx
1966 disestablishments in New York (state)